The National Anti-Communist Front (Frente Anti-Communista Nacional) was a coalition of the anti-communist parties and groups (of ten or more) that supported Carlos Castillo Armas. Its program envisioned economic and social reforms for the development of Guatemala and the elimination of communist infiltration. Its members included the Anti-Communist Unification Party (PUA), Independent Anti-Communist Party of the West (PIACO), Anti-Communist University Students Committee (CEUA), Comités como el Cívico Independiente, Obrero Anticomunista, Femenino Anticomunista, de Locatarias, Asociación Juvenil Anticomunista, among others. In 1955, most member organizations were involved in the establishment of the National Democratic Movement (MDN).

References
Communism in Guatemala, 1944–1954. by Ronald M. Schneider Published in 1979, Octagon Books (New York).
Political parties of the Americas : Canada, Latin America, and the West Indies / edited by Robert J. Alexander. Westport, Conn. : Greenwood Press, 1982.
Political and agrarian development in Guatemala. by Susan A. Berger Published in 1992, Westview Press (Boulder).
A case history of communist penetration: Guatemala. by United States. Dept. of State. Office of Public Services. Published in 1957, (Washington).
Gleijeses, Piero, Shattered Hope: The Guatemalan Revolution and the United States, 1944–1954, Princeton, 1991.
Encyclopedia of Latin American History and Culture: 2nd ed. 2008.

Anti-communist organizations
Political party alliances in Guatemala